Julia Creek is an outback town and locality in the Shire of Mckinlay, Queensland, Australia.

The town of Oorindi is within the west of the locality beside the Oorindi railway station; as at 2019, there is nothing in the town. The town of Gilliat is within the west of the locality beside the Gilliat railway station; as at 2019, there is nothing in the town.

Geography 
Julia Creek is a town in mid northern Queensland, located on the Flinders Highway (Overlanders Way), the main road between Mount Isa and Townsville.

The town of Julia Creek is on the Great Northern Railway; the locality being served by a number of railway stations (from west to east):

 Oorindi railway station
 Bookin railway station, now abandoned
 Tibarri railway station is a railway station
 Gilliat railway station
 Eddington railway station, now abandoned
 Gunjoola railway station
Julia Creek railway station, serving the town
 Quarrells railway station
Nelia railway station

Climate

Julia Creek experiences a hot semi-arid climate (Köppen: BSh, Trewartha: BShl), with a very hot and humid, yet short wet season from December to March; and a long, warm to hot dry season from April to November.

History

The name Julia Creek was named after the niece of Donald McIntyre (younger brother of Duncan McIntyre), the first white settler in the area.

The township began life as a temporary railway terminus in 1907 when the Great Northern railway line was extended from Richmond to service the copper mines at Cloncurry.

Julia Creek Post Office opened by September 1910 (a receiving office had been open from 1907).

Julia Creek State School was a one-room school established in 1911 with nine students, and was expanded in 1932 and again in 1934. A separate high school was constructed in 1963.

In 1952 the town was serviced with electricity.

St Joseph's School opened in 1955 and closed in 1995.

A sixteen-bed hospital was established in 1972.

Julia Creek Public Library was opened in 1994.

The Dirt n Dust Festival sporting and music festival was held in the town annually from 1995 to 2019 and was considered one of Queensland's largest events of its type. After cancellations in 2020 and 2021 due to the COVID-19 pandemic, it was announced in July 2021 that due to a lack of volunteers, and there being no committee to run the event, the Dirt n Dust Festival would no longer be held. But in December 2021, an organising committee was formed and the 2022 festival is expected to commence on Friday 22 April.

Economy

The town's main industries are farming, (especially the beef and wool industries), and mining, which is mainly centred on the South32 mine at nearby Cannington.  The town is a major centre for cattle sales and stock trucking, with a large saleyard and associated facilities.  Prior to the expansion of the railway to the larger towns of Cloncurry and Mount Isa, the town was also a major transport hub for freight and passengers.

Julia Creek is also home to the Julia Creek dunnart which is now endangered because of feral animals (wild cats, dogs & foxes).

Education 
Julia Creek State School is a government primary (Prep-6) school for boys and girls at Burke Street. In 2017, the school had an enrolment of 34 students with 3 teachers and 4 non-teaching staff (3 full-time equivalent).

There are no secondary schools in Julia Creek. The nearest secondary schools are in Richmond (only to Year 10) and Cloncurry (to Year 12).

Amenities 

Julia Creek has a public library, visitor and cultural centre, swimming pool, tennis courts, parks as well as a sports centre.

The Mckinlay Shire Council operates a public library in Julia Creek at 56 Burke Street.

The Julia Creek branch of the Queensland Country Women's Association has its rooms at 51 Burke Street.

St Barnabas Anglican Church is at 1 Burke Street.

Regular services by the Uniting Church in Australia are held in St Baranabas Anglican Church. These are provided by the McKay Patrol, an aerial service of the Uniting Church in Australia that operates out of Cloncurry.

Transport

References

Further reading

External links

 
 
Fairfax Digital Travel Guide
Bureau of Meteorology Weather Conditions
Tanksinker – The Story of Max Burns and the Township of Julia Creek

Towns in Queensland
North West Queensland
Shire of Mckinlay
Localities in Queensland